Euros osticollis is a moth of the family Noctuidae. It is found along streams and seeps in south-western Oregon.

The length of the forewings is 8–9 mm.

The larvae probably feed on Darlingtonia species.

External links
A review of the genus Euros Hy. Edwards (Lepidoptera: Noctuidae: Apameiini) with description of one new species

Apameini